Francesca Doveri (born 21 December 1982) is an Italian female retired heptathlete, which participated at the 2011 World Championships in Athletics.

National records
 Pentathlon: 4423 pts ( Ancona, 1 February 2009) - Current holder
 8.38 (60 metres hurdles), 1.72 m (high jump), 12.39 m (shot put), 6.29 m (long jump), 2:16.41 (800 metres)

Achievements

National titles
She won 5 national championships at senior level.
Italian Athletics Championships
Heptathlon: 2008, 2010
Italian Indoor Athletics Championships
Pentathlon: 2008, 2009, 2011

See also
 Italian records in athletics
 Italian all-time lists - Heptathlon

References

External links
 

1982 births
Italian heptathletes
Italian female pentathletes
World Athletics Championships athletes for Italy
Living people
21st-century Italian women